SFA Softball Field is the home stadium for the Division I (NCAA) Stephen F. Austin Ladyjacks softball team. The stadium is located next to Jaycees Field, home of the Stephen F. Austin Lumberjacks baseball team, in Nacogdoches, Texas. The stadium has seating for 750 fans. Stephen F. Austin State University has a nineteen (19) year exclusive use lease on the stadium with the City of Nacogdoches, Texas starting in 2010. The university made several improvements to the preexisting city softball field including a new playing surface, a warning track, a Daktronics electronic scoreboard, new dugouts, windscreens, a new grandstand, an expanded press box, and bullpens.

The initial home game as the Ladyjacks's official home field was played on February 17, 2010, against the North Texas Mean Green softball team.

The stadium was the home of 2013 Southland Conference softball tournament.

Yearly Attendance 

Below is a yearly summary of the SFA Softball Field attendance.

As of the 2013–14 season.

References

External links
 Stephen F. Austin Ladyjacks Softball Official Website

Stephen F. Austin Ladyjacks softball
College softball venues in the United States
Softball venues in Texas
Sports venues completed in 2010
2010 establishments in Texas
Buildings and structures in Nacogdoches County, Texas